Gebben Miles is a professional clay pigeon shooter.  In 2012 Gebben won the FITASC World Championship.  Miles has numerous other titles and championships including several team World Championships and several National titles.

References 

Sportspeople from Tucson, Arizona
Living people
University of Arizona alumni
Year of birth missing (living people)